Esther Lekain, née Ernestine Nickel (1 April 1870 – 2 March 1960), was a French singer. She was born in Paris and had a very long singing career for 70 years. She died in Nice.

Recordings 
La dernière Gavotte (Vargues – Delormel)
Un vieux farceur (Léon – Nadot)
Les vieilles larmes (Millandy)
Ah ! Si vous voulez d'l'amour (Scotto – Burtey)
Le cœur de Ninon (Buccucci – Bereta – Millandy)
[Tout] Ça ne vaut pas l'amour (Perpignan – Trebitsch)

External links
Du Temps des cerises aux Feuilles mortes : un site consacré à la chanson française de la fin du Second Empire aux années cinquante

1870 births
1960 deaths
Belgian women singers
French-language singers of Belgium